Andrew Murdoch may refer to:

 Andrew Murdoch (sailor), New Zealand sailor
 Andy Murdoch (footballer, born 1968), Scottish footballer (Partick Thistle)
 Andy Murdoch (footballer, born 1995), Scottish footballer (Rangers FC)